Solz may refer to:

Solz (northern), a river of Hesse, Germany, tributary of the Fulda in Bebra about 15 km downstream of the other Solz
Solz (southern), a river of Hesse, Germany, tributary of the Fulda in Bad Hersfeld about 15 km upstream of the other Solz
Trott zu Solz, a Hessian noble family
August von Trott zu Solz (1855–1938), German politician, Prussian Minister of Culture
Adam von Trott zu Solz (1909–1944), German lawyer and diplomat involved in the resistance to Nazism, husband of Clarita
Clarita von Trott zu Solz (1917–2013), was a German medical doctor and psychotherapist, wife of Adam
Wolfgang Solz (1940–2017), German football winger